WONA may refer to:

 WONA-FM, a radio station (95.1 FM) licensed to serve Vaiden, Mississippi, United States
 WLEE-FM, a radio station (95.1 FM) licensed to serve Winona, Mississippi, which held the call sign WONA-FM from 1976 to 2018
 WBTL (AM), a radio station (1540 AM) licensed to serve Richmond, Virginia, United States, which held the call sign WONA from 2016 to 2017
 WLEE (AM), a radio station (1570 AM) licensed to serve Winona, Mississippi, which held the call sign WONA from 1958 to 2016

See also
 "Wona", a 2016 song by Mumford & Sons